Mango Kiss is a 2004 American comedy film written Sarah Elisabeth Brown and Sascha Rice, and directed by Sascha Rice. The plot concerns love between two lesbian friends, Lou and Sassafras.  It is based on the play Bermuda Triangles, written by Sarah Elisabeth Brown. The story for the play was based on the playwright's experience living within the lesbian subculture found in San Francisco in the 1990s.

Plot 
Lou falls in love with her best friend Sassafras, who doesn't know. In order to bring their careers as performance artists forward, they move to San Francisco, where they get into the BDSM scene. Soon they start a princess/daddy role-play: Lou plays out a Sea Captain Daddy role and Sass takes on a brat princess.

Cast 
 Danièle Ferraro as Sassafras
 Michelle Wolff as Lou
 Sally Kirkland as Emilia
 Dru Mouser as Leslie
 Tina Marie Murray as Chelsea Chuwawa
 Shannon Rossiter as Micky
 Joe Mellis as Kaz
 Malia Spanyol as Bridget
 Windy Morgan Bunts as Ginny
 Dominique Zeltzman as Sonya
 Lena Zee as Karla
 Alicia Simmons-Miracle as Boss Daddy (billed as Alicia Simmons)
 Laura Baca as Allison
 Max Miller as Val
 Walter Barry as Mr. Fuchsia
 Chris Villa as Mr. Leather (billed as Christopher Villa)
 Delphine Brody as Booze Girl
 Katherine Armstrong as Little Girl on Beach

Reviews

Awards 
 2004
Park City Film Music Festival (Feature Film: Director's Choice)
 Gold Medal for Excellence
 Sydney Mardi Gras Film Festival
 Best Lesbian Film 		-
Park City Film Music Festival
 Director's Choice Award: Gold Medal for Excellence
North Carolina Gay & Lesbian Film Festival
 Emerging Filmmaker Award: Best Women's Feature

References

External links
 Mango Kiss - official Website

 rottentomatoes.com
 Review of Mango Kiss
 Variety

2004 films
BDSM in films
2004 comedy films
American LGBT-related films
Lesbian-related films
American comedy films
2004 LGBT-related films
2000s English-language films
2000s American films